Bruguière is a surname. Notable people with the surname include:

Barthélemy Bruguière (1792-1835), first Apostolic Vicar of Korea
Jean-Louis Bruguière, French judge.
Jean Guillaume Bruguière (1749 or 1750–1798), French physician, zoologist, diplomat.
Francis Bruguière (1879-1944), American photographer.

French-language surnames